The seventeenth season of the animated television series South Park was announced on May 10, 2013 that premiered on Comedy Central on September 25, 2013 and ended on December 11, 2013. The season satirized various topics and cultural institutions including Minecraft, the George Zimmerman murder trials, the 2013 mass surveillance disclosures, and the HBO television fantasy drama, Game of Thrones. The season received generally positive reviews, with criticism mainly aimed at the start of the season and much praise going to the Black Friday trilogy, which was hailed by IGN to be the show's best multi-arc series since the Imaginationland trilogy. The series continually maintained high ratings throughout the season.

Production
The season consists of 10 episodes, as series creators Trey Parker and Matt Stone decided to scale back and have one uninterrupted season, as opposed to two 7-episode runs, as had been the format since Season 8. Bill Hader, a former Saturday Night Live cast member, began working full-time on the show as a staff writer.

Due to a power outage at the studio, episode 4 ("Goth Kids 3: Dawn of the Posers") missed the deadline and aired a week later than scheduled.

Episodes

References

2013 American television seasons